Streptomyces sannanensis is a bacterium species from the genus of Streptomyces which has been isolated from soil from Japan. Streptomyces sannanensis produces istamycin A, isostreptazolin, sannaphenol, sannanine
and antibiotics from the sannamycin complex.

Further reading

See also 
 List of Streptomyces species

References

External links
Type strain of Streptomyces sannanensis at BacDive -  the Bacterial Diversity Metadatabase	

sannanensis
Bacteria described in 1981